The North Fork American River is the longest branch of the American River in Northern California.

It rises at Mountain Meadow Lake near the  peak of Granite Chief in the Tahoe National Forest. Flowing initially northwest, the river soon swings west into a gorge, paralleling the Forest Hill Divide on the south. Big Granite Creek then joins the North Fork of the American River coming in from the right. The canyon shallows as the river turns southwest, carving through the Sierra foothills, then turning abruptly south near Colfax.

Below the dam, the river bends south, passing under the Foresthill Bridge, the highest bridge in California, then receives the Middle Fork American River, its largest tributary, from the left. The valley widens as the river flows south past Auburn, soon emptying into the north arm of Folsom Lake, a reservoir formed in 1955 by the Folsom Dam. Its waters merge in the lake with those of the South Fork American River and form the American River, a tributary of the Sacramento River.

See also

Auburn Dam
California Gold Rush
Mountain Quarries Bridge — on the North Fork.

References

External links
 North Fork American Wild and Scenic River - BLM page

Rivers of the Sierra Nevada (United States)
Rivers of El Dorado County, California
Rivers of Placer County, California
Tributaries of the Sacramento River
Rivers of Northern California
Rivers of the Sierra Nevada in California